The Rebel Stakes is a Grade II American Thoroughbred horse race for three-year-old horses: one and one-sixteenth miles run on dirt each March at Oaklawn Park Race Track in Hot Springs, Arkansas.  As of 2022, it offers a purse of $1,000,000. It is the second leg of Oaklawn's three-year-old stakes program, run after the Southwest Stakes and before the Arkansas Derby; it is also part of the Road to the Kentucky Derby.

History

The race was first run on March 18, 1961, as the Rebel Handicap over a distance of one mile and seventy yards. It was won by Mrs. Vera E. Smith's Bass Clef in 1:42. The victory was Bass Clef's fifth in a row, a run that included the Louisiana Derby. Later in the spring, Bass Clef would finish third to Carry Back in the Kentucky Derby.

The event immediately became a preparatory event for the Arkansas Derby. The 1965 winner Swift Ruler won both races.

In 1984, the conditions of the event were changed from handicap to stakes allowance and the event was renamed the Rebel Stakes. That same year the distance was increased to one and one-sixteenth miles.

In 1990, the event was upgraded to Grade III. It was downgraded to Listed for the 2003 and 2004 runnings. It was upgraded in 2008 to a Grade II by the American Graded Stakes Committee.

Since 2013, the event has been part of the Road to the Kentucky Derby.

In 2019, the event was split into two divisions after Oaklawn president Louis Cella presented a sporting gesture after the San Felipe Stakes was abandoned in California. Road to Kentucky Derby qualification points for the first four finishers were adjusted.

Records
Time record:

 miles  – 1:41.00  Vanlandingham (1984)  
1 mile and 70 yards –  1:40.80   Betemight  (1967)

Margins:
7 lengths –  Etony  (1968), Manastash Ridge  (1989)

Most wins by an owner:
 5 - Loblolly Stable (1980, 1984, 1987, 1992, 1993)

Most wins by a jockey:
 5 - Mike E. Smith (1986, 1993, 1999, 2014, 2019)

Most wins by a trainer:
 8 - Bob Baffert (2010, 2011, 2012, 2014, 2015, 2016, 2020, 2021)

Rebel Stakes – Arkansas Derby double:

 Swift Ruler (1965), Traffic Mark (1969), Promised City (1975), Temperence Hill (1980), Bold Ego (1981), Sunny's Halo (1983), Demons Begone (1987), Pine Bluff (1992), Victory Gallop (1998), Smarty Jones (2004), Lawyer Ron (2006), Curlin (2007), American Pharoah (2015), Omaha Beach (2019)

Winners

Notes:

§ Ran as an entry

ƒ Ran as the field entry

† Floral Shop was first past the post but was disqualified for interference and placed second. Spike Nail was declared the winner.

See also
 Road to the Kentucky Derby
 List of American and Canadian Graded races

External links
 Oaklawn Park Media Guide 2021

References

1961 establishments in Arkansas
Horse races in Arkansas
Oaklawn Park
Flat horse races for three-year-olds
Triple Crown Prep Races
Graded stakes races in the United States
Recurring sporting events established in 1961
Grade 2 stakes races in the United States